In mathematics, a space form is a complete Riemannian manifold M of constant sectional curvature K. The three most fundamental examples are Euclidean n-space, the n-dimensional sphere, and hyperbolic space, although a space form need not be simply connected.

Reduction to generalized crystallography

See also
Borel conjecture

References
 
 

Riemannian geometry
Conjectures